Somewhere We Both Walk is a second self-released work from Maine's Nesey Gallons. It was put together in a limited edition, CD-R format of Eyes & Eyes & Eyes Ago with homemade packaging along with Two Bicycles and includes a booklet of something written by Gallons himself.  It is "a cdr of a phase piece i recorded in brooklyn with a little booklet of a "love story" written at the same time. im the only one who plays on it (bowed things out of phase) but it was recorded in the apartment where julian and i lived when a lot of fine work was done on clouds and tornadoes. its meant to be played impossibly loud through speakers while reading the "story". i hope this clarifies things a bit."

On March 13, 2015, the book and CD-R were reissued by the Michigan label Carousel Breakfast.

Track listing
 "Somewhere We Both Walk"  – 28:06

References

2009 albums
Nesey Gallons albums